Alex Gough (born 8 December 1970, in Newport, Wales) is a Welsh professional squash player.

Gough reached a career-high world ranking of World No. 5 in 1998. He won a bronze medal in the men's singles at the 1998 Commonwealth Games.

Since retiring he went on to become the CEO of the Professional Squash Association (PSA).

External links 
 
 
 

Sportspeople from Newport, Wales
Welsh male squash players
Commonwealth Games bronze medallists for Wales
Squash players at the 1998 Commonwealth Games
Living people
1970 births
Commonwealth Games medallists in squash
Medallists at the 1998 Commonwealth Games